Jo Ha-rang (born 15 July 1991) is a South Korean handball player for Gwangju City and the South Korean national team.

She participated at the 2017 World Women's Handball Championship.

References

1991 births
Living people
South Korean female handball players
Handball players at the 2020 Summer Olympics